Lilya Djenaoui (born ) is an Algerian female volleyball player. With her club GS Petroliers she competed at the 2014 FIVB Volleyball Women's Club World Championship.

References

External links
 profile at FIVB.org

1997 births
Living people
Algerian women's volleyball players
Place of birth missing (living people)
21st-century Algerian people